List of Guggenheim fellows for 1973.

United States and Canada fellows 

 Richard Newbold Adams, Rapoport Centennial Professor Emeritus of Liberal Arts, University of Texas at Austin.
 Robert Hickman Adams, photographer, Astoria, Oregon, 1973, 1980.
 Renata Adler, writer, New York City.
 Hugh G. J. Aitken, deceased. Economic History.
 George A. Akerlof, Professor of Economics, University of California, Berkeley.
 Gustave Alef, Professor Emeritus of History, University of Oregon.
 Reginald Allen, curator, The Gilbert and Sullivan Collection, Pierpont Morgan Library, New York City.
 William Alonso, Richard Saltonstall Professor of Population Policy in the Faculty of Public Health, Harvard University.
 Edward Anders, Horace B. Horton Emeritus Professor of Physical Science, University of Chicago.
 Evan H. Appelman, retired Senior Chemist, Argonne National Laboratory, University of Chicago.
 Frederick Charles Barghoorn, deceased. Political Science.
 Ilhan Basgöz, Professor of Uralic and Altaic Studies, Indiana University.
 Leslie Bassett, composer; Albert A. Stanley Distinguished University Professor Emeritus of Music, University of Michigan School of Music: 1973, 1980.
 James H. Beck, Professor of Art History, and Director, Casa Italiana Center for Italian Studies, Columbia University.
 Ivar E. Berg, Professor of Sociology, University of Pennsylvania.
 Joseph S. Berliner, Rosen Family Professor Emeritus of Economics, Brandeis University.
 Abraham Harry Black, deceased. Psychology.
 Henry G. Blosser, University Distinguished Professor, Michigan State University.
 Ilya Bolotowsky, deceased. Fine Arts.
 Karl S. Bottigheimer, Professor of History, State University of New York at Stony Brook
 Paul A. Bouissac, Professor of French, Victoria College, University of Toronto.
 Mary Jean Bowman, Professor Emeritus of Education and of Economics, University of Chicago.
 Paul Samuel Boyer, Merle Curti Professor of History, University of Wisconsin, Madison.
 Winslow Russell Briggs, Director Emeritus, Department of Plant Biology, Carnegie Institution of Washington, Stanford, California.
 Harold Brookfield, Professor of Human Geography, Australian National University.
 H. Allen Brooks, Professor Emeritus of Fine Arts, University of Toronto.
 Peter P. Brooks, Chester D. Tripp Professor of Humanities, Yale University.
 Brock Brower, writer, Princeton, New Jersey.
 Donald J. Brown, Philip R. Allen Professor of Economics, Yale University.
 Leon Carl Brown, Garrett Professor in Foreign Affairs Emeritus, Princeton University.
 Marvin Brown, Artist, New Rochelle, New York.
 Merle Elliott Brown, deceased. Literary Criticism.
 William L. Brown, Jr., deceased. Professor of Entomology, Cornell University.
 Stuart Weems Bruchey, Allan Nevins Professor Emeritus of American Economic History, Columbia University.
 John P. Bunker, Visiting Fellow, King's College, London; Professor Emeritus of Anesthesia, Stanford University School of Medicine.
 David Lowry Burgess, Dean, College of Fine Arts, Carnegie Mellon University.
 David Bird Burner, Professor of History, State University of New York at Stony Brook.
 Jack Wesley Burnham, Jr., Professor of Art, University of Maryland at College Park.
 Jeffrey Martin Camhi, Professor of Biology, Hebrew University, Jerusalem.
 Charles R. Cantor, Chief Scientific Officer, Sequenom, Inc, San Diego, CA.
 Sherwin Carlquist, Violetta L. Horton Professor Emeritus of Botany, Claremont Graduate University and Rancho Santa Ana Botanic Garden.
 Paul Alexander Castelfranco, Emeritus Professor of Botany, University of California, Davis.
 James Joseph Castles, Executive Associate Dean and Professor of Internal Medicine, University of California, Davis.
 Maarten Jan Chrispeels, Professor of Biology, University of California, San Diego.
 Chryssa, artist, New York City.
 Grady Edward Clay, deceased. Editor, Landscape Architecture Quarterly, Washington, DC.
 Roderick Keener Clayton, Professor Emeritus of Biophysics, Cornell University: 1973, 1980.
 Edward M. Coffman, Professor Emeritus of History, University of Wisconsin–Madison.
 Marvin Leonard Colker, Professor of Classics, University of Virginia.
 R. John Collier, Maude and Lillian Presley Professor of Microbiology and Molecular Genetics, Harvard Medical School.
 Harold C. Conklin, Crosby Professor Emeritus of Anthropology, Yale University.
 Robert James Cook, R. J. Cook Endowed Chair in Wheat Research, Washington State University
 F. Edward Cranz, Rosemary Park Professor Emeritus of History, Connecticut College.
 Stuart A. Curran, Vartan Gregorian Professor of English, University of Pennsylvania.
 Robert Dallek, Professor of History, Boston University.
 Robert F. Dalzell, Jr., Ephraim Williams Professor of American History, Williams College.
 Bill Dane, photographer, Point Richmond, California: 1973, 1982.
 Donald Davidson, Willis S. and Marion Slusser Professor of Philosophy, University of California, Berkeley.
 Carl Dawson, Professor of English, University of Delaware.
 Robert J. DeLange, Professor of Biological Chemistry, University of California, Los Angeles.
 Daniel Dembrosky, filmmaker, Hackensack, New Jersey.
 Richard Lawrence de Neufville, Chair, Professor of Civil Engineering, Massachusetts Institute of Technology.
 Alfred Diamant, Professor Emeritus of Political Science and West European Studies, Indiana University.
 David Diao, artist, New York City.
 Morris Dickstein, Distinguished Professor of English, Queens College and Graduate Center, City University of New York.
 Howard Marvin Dintzis, Professor of Biophysics, Johns Hopkins University School of Medicine.
 William Read Dolbier, Jr., Professor of Chemistry, University of Florida.
 Russell Stephen Drago, deceased. Chemistry.
 Edwin Ellsworth Dugger, composer; Professor of Music, University of California, Berkeley.
 Peter James Duignan, Senior Fellow Emeritus and Stella and Ira Lillick Curator, Africa Collection, Hoover Institution on War, Revolution and Peace, Stanford University.
 Lewis Joachim Edinger, Professor Emeritus of Government, Columbia University.
 Peter Dorman Eimas, Fred M. Seed Professor Emeritus of Cognitive and Linguistic Sciences, Brown University.
 Robert Claude Elston, Professor of Epidemiology and Biostatistics, Case Western Reserve University, Cleveland, Ohio.
 Ed Emshwiller, deceased. Film and Video Art: 1973, 1978.
 Charles Joseph Epstein, Professor of Pediatrics, School of Medicine, University of California, San Francisco.
 Jean-Claude Falmagne, Professor of Cognitive Science, University of California, Irvine.
 Paul Gerard Federbush, Professor of Mathematics, University of Michigan.
 Gerald Feinberg, deceased. Physics.
 Gerald Donald Feldman, Professor of History, University of California, Berkeley.
 Irving Feldman, poet; Distinguished Professor of English, State University of New York at Buffalo.
 Shoshana Felman, Associate Professor of French, Yale University.
 Leopold B. Felsen, Professor of Electrophysics and Dean of Engineering, Polytechnic Institute of New York.
 Anne D. Ferry, Emeritus Professor of English, Boston College.
 Robert M. Fogelson, Professor of Urban Studies and History, Massachusetts Institute of Technology.
 Thomas M. Franck, Professor of Law; Director, Center for International Studies, New York University: 1973, 1982.
 Mary Frank, artist, New York City: 1973, 1983.
 Russell Alfred Fraser, Austin Warren Professor Emeritus of English Literature and Language, University of Michigan.
 Daniel Z. Freedman, Professor of Applied Mathematics, Massachusetts Institute of Technology: 1973, 1985.
 Michael Martin Fried, Professor of History of Art, Johns Hopkins University.
 Frederick Eugene Gaines, Director of Theatre, Lawrence University, Appleton, WI.
 Gary Cloyd Galbraith, Professor of Psychology, University of California, Los Angeles.
 John S. Galbraith, Professor Emeritus of History, University of California, San Diego.
 John Gardner, deceased. Fiction.
 Lloyd C. Gardner, Charles and Mary Beard Professor of History, Rutgers College, Rutgers University.
 Gordon Paul Garmire, Evan Pugh Professor of Astronomy, Pennsylvania State University.
 Richard A. Gatti, Professor of Pathology, School of Medicine, University of California, Los Angeles; Director, Pediatric Oncology and Immunology, Cedars-Sinai Medical Center, Los Angeles.
 James L. Gaylor, Associate Director of Life Sciences, Glenolden Laboratory, Glenolden, Pennsylvania.
 Rochel Gelman, Professor of Psychology, University of California, Los Angeles.
 Alan Gelperin, Member of Technical Staff, Bell Laboratories, Murray Hill, New Jersey.
 Ian R. Gibbons, research scientist, University of California, Berkeley.
 Carl Hunter Gibson, Professor of Engineering Physics and Oceanography, University of California, San Diego.
 Bentley B. Gilbert, Professor of Emeritus of History, University of Illinois at Chicago Circle.
 Brendan Gill, deceased. Biography.
 Joel Louis Gold, filmmaker, New York City.
 Walter Goodman, critic and senior writer, The New York Times.
 Charles Franklin Gordon, playwright, New York City.
 Adon Alden Gordus, Professor of Chemistry, University of Michigan.
 George Jackson Graham, Jr., Chair, Professor of Political Science, Vanderbilt University.
 David M. Green, Emeritus Professor of Psychology, University of Florida.
 James G. Greeno, Margaret Jacks Professor of Education, Stanford University.
 Anthony James Gregor, Professor of Political Science, University of California, Berkeley.
 Lawrence Grossman, University Distinguished Professor of Biochemistry, The Johns Hopkins University.
 Morton E. Gurtin, Professor of Mathematics, Carnegie Mellon University.
 Joseph Robert Gusfield, Professor of Sociology, University of California, San Diego.
 Hans Haacke, artist; Professor of Art, Cooper Union School of Art and Architecture.
 Ernst B. Haas, Robson Research Professor of Government, University of California, Berkeley.
 Charles Adam Hale, Emeritus Professor of History, University of Iowa.
 Michael David Hall, artist; Head, Sculpture Department, Cranbrook Academy of Art, Bloomfield Hills, Michigan.
 Frederick Hammersley, artist, Albuquerque, New Mexico.
 Eric Pratt Hamp, Robert Maynard Hutchins Distinguished Service Professor of Linguistics, University of Chicag.
 Charley Dean Hardwick, Professor of Philosophy and Religion, American University.
 William Neal Harrison, deceased. Writer; Ex University Professor of English, University of Arkansas.
 John M. Headley, Professor of History, University of North Carolina at Chapel Hill.
 Reinhold August Friedrich Heller, Professor of Art, University of Chicago.
 Richard Hellie, Professor of Russian History, University of Chicago.
 Mike Henderson, filmmaker; Professor of Art, University of California, Davis. Appointed as Henderson, William.
 David Michael Hercules, Chair, Centennial Professor of Chemistry, Vanderbilt University.
 Andrew Hughes, Associate Professor of Musicology, University of Toronto.
 Vincent Jaccarino, Professor and Director, Quantum Institute, University of California, Santa Barbara.
 Lloyd Miles Jackman, Professor of Chemistry, Pennsylvania State University.
 Laura Riding Jackson, deceased. Literary Criticism.
 Eugenia Parry Janis, Adjunct Professor of Art, University of New Mexico.
 Irving Lester Janis, deceased. Psychology.
 William Platt Jencks, Rosenstiel Professor of Biochemistry, Brandeis University.
 Chalmers Ashby Johnson, Professor of Political Science, University of California, San Diego.
 Klaus W. Jonas, Professor Emeritus of Germanic Languages and Literatures, University of Pittsburgh.
 James M. Jones, Professor of Psychology, University of Delaware, and Director, Minority Fellowship Program, American Psychological Association, Washington, D.C..
 Madison Jones, novelist; Emeritus Professor of English and Alumni Writer-in-Residence, Auburn University.
 James Kennedy, filmmaker, Santa Monica, California.
 X. J. Kennedy, poet, Lexington, Massachusetts. Appointed as Kennedy, Joseph Charles.
 Eva C. Keuls, Emeritus Professor of Classics, University of Minnesota.
 James R. Kincaid, Aerol Arnold Professor of English, University of Southern California: 1973, 1982.
 Toichiro Kinoshita, Emeritus Professor of Physics, Cornell University.
 David John James Kinsman, independent environmental consultant; retired, Freshwater Biological Association, Cumbria, England.
 Bernard Edwin Kirschenbaum, deceased. artist, New York City.
 Margaret Galland Kivelson, Professor of Space Physics, Institute of Geophysics and Planetary Physics, University of California, Los Angeles.
 Nicholas Krall, Vice President, Krall Associates, Del Mar, California.
 Stephen M. Krane, Persis, Cyrus and Marlow B. Harrison Professor of Medicine, Harvard Medical School.
 Norman Kretchmer, deceased. Medicine.
 Myrna Lamb, playwright, New York City.
 Rosette Clementine Lamont, Emeritus Professor of French and Comparative Literature, Graduate Program, CUNY.
 Hubert Darrell Lance, Emeritus Professor of Old Testament Interpretation and Dean of the Faculty, Colgate Rochester Divinity School, Rochester, New York.
 George Paul Landow, Professor of English and Art, Brown University: 1973, 1978.
 Lawrence Juen-Yee Lau, Kwoh-Ting Li Professor of Economic Development, Stanford University.
 P. Herbert Leiderman, Emeritus Professor of Psychiatry, Stanford University School of Medicine.
 Philip Levine, poet, New York City: 1973, 1980.
 Hsi-Huey Liang, Emeritus Professor of History, Vassar College.
 Stephen Lichtenbaum, Professor of Mathematics, Brown University.
 Charles Lockwood, writer and corporate strategist, Topanga, California.
 John Leask Lumley, Willis H. Carrier Professor of Engineering, Cornell University.
 Wendy Snyder MacNeil, photographer; Assistant Professor of Art, Wellesley College.
 Waldo George Magnuson, Jr., retired Senior Staff Engineer, Electronics Engineering Department, Lawrence Livermore Laboratory, University of California, Livermore.
 Dominic W. Massaro, Professor of Psychology, University of California, Santa Cruz.
 Michael McClure, poet; Professor of English, California College of Arts and Crafts.
 Lionel Wilfred McKenzie, Wilson Professor Emeritus of Economics, University of Rochester.
 David McNeill, Professor of Behavioral Sciences and Linguistics, University of Chicago.
 Murray Mednick, playwright; artistic director, Padva Hills Playwrights' Workshop, Los Angeles.
 Boyd Mefferd, artist, Canton, Connecticut.
 William S. Merwin, poet, haiku, Hawaii; Distinguished Professor of Humanities, Cooper Union for the Advancement of Science and Art: 1973, 1983.
 Ellen Mickiewicz, Alben W. Barkley Professor of Political Science, Emory University; Director, Soviet Media and Int'l Communications Program, The Carter Center, Atlanta, GA.
 Barton A. Midwood, writer; co-director, New York Studio for Writers, Garden City, NY.
 Deborah Duff Milenkovitch, President, Calhoun Corporation, New York City.
 Arthur Green Miller, Professor of Art History, University of Maryland.
 Julian Malcolm Miller, deceased. Chemistry.
 Robert Rush Miller, Professor Emeritus of Biology and Curator Emeritus of Fishes, University of Michigan.
 Nicholas Mrosovsky, Professor of Zoology and Psychology, University of Toronto.
 Walter Francis Murphy, McCormick Professor Emeritus of Jurisprudence, Princeton University.
 Forrest W. Myers, sculptor, New York City.
 Awadh K. Narain, Professor Emeritus of History and South Asian Studies, University of Wisconsin–Madison.
 Andrew James Nathan, Professor of Political Science, Columbia University.
 Gunvor Nelson, filmmaker, Kristinehamn, Sweden.
 Jacob Neusner, Distinguished Research Professor of Religious Studies, University of South Florida, Tampa: 1973, 1979.
 John Nicholas Newman, Professor of Naval Architecture, Massachusetts Institute of Technology.
 David Shepherd Nivison, Walter Y. Evans-Wentz Emeritus Professor of Oriental Philosophies, Religions and Ethics, Stanford University.
 Park S. Nobel, Professor of Biology, University of California, Los Angeles.
 Richard J. Ofshe, Associate Professor of Sociology, University of California, Berkeley.
 Pauline Oliveros, composer, Kingston, New York.
 Raymond Lee Orbach, Chancellor, University of California, Riverside.
 Gordon Howell Orians, Professor Emeritus of Zoology, University of Washington.
 Leo Nicholas Ornston, Professor of Biology, Yale University.
 Robert R. Palmer, Professor Emeritus of History, Yale University.
 Joseph Papaleo, writer; member of the Faculty Emeritus, Sarah Lawrence College.
 Alexander A. Parker, dDeceased. Professor Emeritus of Spanish and Portuguese, University of Texas at Austin
 Alan Peshkin, Visiting Professor of Education, Stanford, University; Professor Emeritus of Education, University of Illinois at Champaign-Urbana.
 Stanley Peters, Professor of Linguistics and Symbolic Systems, Stanford University.
 Laurence E. Peterson, Emeritus Professor of Physics; Director, Center for Astrophysics and Space Sciences, University of California, San Diego.
 Warner L. Peticolas, Professor of Chemistry, University of Oregon.
 Ted Edgar Petrie, Professor of Mathematics, Rutgers College, Rutgers University.
 Matthew Phillips, artist, Berkeley, California.
 Frances Fox Piven, Distinguished Professor of Political Science and Sociology, Graduate Center, City University of New York.
 Stanley Plumly, poet; Distinguished Professor of English, University of Maryland at College Park.
 Robert Otto Pohl, Professor of Physics, Cornell University.
 Burton Ralph Pollin, Professor Emeritus of English, Bronx Community College, City University of New York.
 Robert Pollock, composer; artistic director, Composers Guild of NJ, Ship Bottom, New Je.
 John Herman Richard Polt, Professor of Spanish, University of California, Berkeley.
 Basilios N. Poulos, artist; Associate Professor of Fine Arts, Rice University.
 William H. Pritchard, Henry Clay Folger Professor of English, Amherst College.
 Daniel Gray Quillen, Member of the Faculty of Mathematical Sciences, Magdalen College, Oxford University.
 John Oscar Rasmussen, Jr., Emeritus Professor of Chemistry, University of California, Berkeley.
 Willis Harmon Ray, Vilas Research Professor of Engineering, University of Wisconsin–Madison.
 Stuart Reiner, Senior Lecturer in Music, University of Cape Town.
 Louis Philip Remsberg, Jr., Chemist, Brookhaven National Laboratory.
 Paul Linford Richards, Professor of Physics, University of California, Berkeley.
 John Rodgers, Silliman Professor Emeritus of Geology, Yale University.
 Gordon Rogoff, Professor of Dramaturgy and Dramatic Literature, Yale Drama School, New Haven, CT.
 Richard McKay Rorty, Professor of Comparative Literature, Stanford University.
 Richard Rose, Professor of Public Policy and Director of the Centre for the Study of Public Policy, University of Strathclyde, Glasgow.
 Richard Newton Rosecrance, Professor of Political Science, University of California, Los Angeles.
 Charles Rosen, Professor of Music, University of Chicago.
 Edgar Rosenberg, Professor of English and Comparative Literature, Cornell University.
 Robert Rosenthal, Edgar Pierce Professor Emeritus of Psychology, Harvard University; Professor of Psychology, University of California, Riverside.
 Robert Ryman, artist, New York City.
 John E. Savage, Professor of Computer Science, Brown University.
 Robert F. Sayre, Emeritus Professor of English, University of Iowa.
 John R. Scheffer, Professor of Chemistry, University of British Columbia.
 Wilfried Schmid, Dwight Parker Robinson Professor of Mathematics, Harvard University: 1973, 1988.
 Kenneth Ray Scholberg, deceased. Spanish Literature.
 J. William Schopf, Professor of Paleobiology and Director, Center for the Study of Evolution and the Origin of Life, University of California, Los Angeles: 1973, 1988.
 James Scully, poet; Professor Emeritus of English, University of Connecticut.
 John Douglas Seelye, Graduate Research Professor of English, University of Florida.
 Richard Sennett, Professor of Sociology, New York University.
 Kenneth L. Servis, Professor of Chemistry, University of Southern California.
 Neil Sheehan, writer, Washington, D.C.
 Michael L. Shelanski, Francis Delafield Professor and Chairman of Pathology, Columbia University.
 Sonia Landy Sheridan, photographer; Professor Emeritus of Generative Systems, School of the Art Institute of Chicago.
 Alan J. Shields, artist, Shelter Island, New York.
 William Silen, Johnson and Johnson Distinguished Professor of Surgery, Harvard Medical School.
 Robert H. Silsbee, Emeritus Professor of Physics and Director, Materials Science Center, Cornell University.
 Neil J. Smelser, Director, Center for Advanced Study in the Behavioral Sciences, Stanford, California.
 David Hamilton Smith, deceased. Medicine & Health.
 Robert I. Smithson, deceased, Fine Arts-Sculpture.
 Jack Sonenberg, artist; Professor of Fine Arts, Pratt Institute.
 Gilbert Sorrentino, writer; Emeritus Professor of English, Stanford University: 1973, 1987.
 Michael Ellman Soulé, Emeritus Professor of Natural Resources, University of California, Santa Cruz.
 Marvin Spevack, Professor (Ordinarius) of English and Director of the English Seminar, University of Münster.
 Steven Lee Spiegel, Associate Professor of Political Science, University of California, Los Angeles.
 Seymour Spilerman, Julian C. Levi Professor of Social Science, Columbia University.
 Oliver H. Statler, writer; Adjunct Professor, Asian Studies, University of Hawaii, Honolulu.
 Peter Nathaniel Stearns, Dean, College of Humanities and Social Sciences and Heinz Professor of History, Carnegie Mellon University.
 Jane W. Stedman, Professor Emeritus of English, Roosevelt University.
 Ronald Steel, writer, Washington, DC; Professor, School of International Relations, Los Angeles, CA.
 Richard G. Stern, writer; Regenstern Professor of English and American Language and Literature, University of Chicago.
 Bernt Petter Stigum, Professor of Economics, University of Oslo.
 Michael Sullivan, Christensen Professor Emeritus of Oriental Art, Stanford University.
 Donald Wayne Sutherland, deceased. Medieval Studies.
 Masamichi Takesaki, Professor of Mathematics, University of California, Los Angeles.
 Paul Talalay, John Jacob Abel Distinguished Service Professor, The Johns Hopkins University School of Medicine.
 Manik Talwani, Professor of Geology, Lamont-Doherty Geological Observatory, Columbia University.
 Ronald Tavel, playwright, Bangkok.
 Cecil P. Taylor, composer, New York City.
 Malvin C. Teich, Professor of Electrical & Computer Engineering, Biomedical Engineering and Physics, Boston University.
 David Paul Thelen, editor, Journal of American History, Indiana University.
 Carl E. Thoresen, Associate Dean, Academic Affairs; Professor of Education and Psychology, Stanford University.
 George A. Tice, Photographer; Instructor in Photography, New School for Social Research and School of Visual Arts, New York City.
 William Trager, Professor of Parasitology, Rockefeller University.
 George H. Trilling, Professor Emeritus of Physics, University of California, Berkeley.
 Michael Thomas Turvey, Professor of Psychology, University of Connecticut.
 Frederic Tuten, writer; Assistant Professor of English, City College, City University of New York.
 Peter Kenneth Unger, Professor of Philosophy, New York University.
 John Vachon, deceased. Photography.
 Kensal Edward Van Holde, Emeritus Distinguished Professor of Biophysics, Oregon State University.
 Jean-Claude van Itallie, playwright; President, Shantigar Foundation, Rowe, Massachusetts: 1973, 1980.
 Alden T. Vaughan, Emeritus Professor of History, Columbia University.
 Joan Eveline Vincent, Emeritus Professor of Anthropology, Barnard College, Columbia University.
 Peter Hans von Hippel, Professor of Chemistry, University of Oregon.
 Frederic Evans Wakeman, Jr., Haas Professor of Asian Studies, University of California, Berkeley.
 Joseph A. Walker, playwright; Professor of Drama, Howard University.
 Emily Stipes Watts, Professor of English, University of Illinois at Urbana-Champaign.
 Theodore Weesner, writer; Associate Professor of Creative Writing, Carnegie Mellon University.
 Louis Weingarden, deceased. Composer.
 David Loeb Weiss, filmmaker, Brooklyn, New York.
 Gerald Weissmann, Professor of Medicine; Director, Division of Rheumatology, New York University Medical Center.
 Roger Wertheimer, Professor of Philosophy, University of Houston.
 Arthur H. Westing, consultant, Westing Associates in Environment, Security, and Education, Putney, Vermont.
 Harrison Colyar White, Professor of Sociology, Columbia University.
 Herbert S. Wilf, Professor of Mathematics, University of Pennsylvania.
 Kathleen Mary Williams, deceased. 18th Century English Literature.
 Mason Willrich, President and CEO, Pacific Gas and Electric Company, San Francisco, California.
 John Wilmerding, Christopher Binyon Sarofim '86 Professor of American Art, Princeton University.
 Stanley George Wojcicki, Professor of Physics, Stanford University.
 Lincoln Wolfenstein, University Professor of Physics, Carnegie Mellon University: 1973, 1983.
 Michael George Wood, Professor of English Literature, University of Exeter.
 James Edward Wright, President, Dartmouth College.
 Nien-chu C. Yang, Gustavus F. and Ann M. Swift Distinguished Service Professor of Chemistry, University of Chicago.
 Jan A. D. Zeevaart, University Distinguished Professor, MSU/ERDA Plant Research Laboratory, Michigan State University.

Latin American and Caribbean Fellows

 Olga de Amaral, artist, Bogotá.
 Augusto Pinto Boal, writer and theatre director, Paris: 1973, 1975.
 Hugo Hermes Campos, deceased. Biology and Ecology.
 Oscar Enrique Cornblit, Senior Research Associate, Social Research Center, Torcuato Di Tella Institute, Buenos Aires.
 Zoltan de Cserna, Research Professor Emeritus, Institute de Geología, UNAM.
 Antonio Di Benedetto, deceased, Fiction.
 Víctor Jorge Elías, Professor of Economics, University Nacional de Tucumán.
 Isabel Fraire Benson, writer, Essex, England.
 Gunther Gerzso, artist, Mexico D.F.. 
 Mario Góngora del Campo, Professor of History, Catholic University of Chile.
 Silvio Grichener, architect; Director Institute of Technology, University of Buenos Aires:.
 Ramón Gutiérrez, director, Department of History of Architecture, National University of the Northeast, Corrientes.
 Miguel Holle Ostendorf, director, Andean Agricultural Systems Research Project, Lima, Peru.
 Alvaro Jara, ry, University of Chile.
 Jorge Miguel Katz, Professor of Industrial Economics, University of Buenos Aires.
 Miguel G. Kiwi, Professor of Physics, Catholic University of Chile.
 Francis Korn, research sociologist, National Research Council of Argentina and Torcuato di Tella Institute; Professor of Sociology, Catholic University of Argentina.
 Héctor Manjarrez, writer, Mexico, D.F.
 Avatar da Silva Moraes, artist, Rio de Janeiro, Brazil.
 Julio Ortega, Professor of Latin American and Comparative Literature, Brown University.
 Armando José Parodi, Professor of Cell Biology, Instituto de Investigaciones Biotectonogicas, Buenos Aires, Argentina.
 Barry Reckord, playwright, London.
 Maria Rostworowski de Diez Canseco, senior researcher, Institute of Peruvian Studies, Lima.
 Paul Israel Singer, Professor of Economics, University of Sao Paulo; Senior Economist, Brazilian Center for Analysis and Planning, Sao Paulo.
 Juan Alfredo Tirao, Professor of Mathematics, National University of Córdoba.
 Carlos Tünnermann Bernheim, Special Advisor to the Director of UNESCO, Managua, Nicaragua: 1973, 1989.
 Arturo Warman, Director General, Instituto Nacional Indigenista, Mexico.
 Nicim Zagury, Associate Professor of Physics, Catholic University of Rio de Janeiro.

See also
Guggenheim Fellowship
List of Guggenheim Fellowships awarded in 1972
List of Guggenheim Fellowships awarded in 1974

References

External links
Guggenheim Fellows for 1973

1973
1973 awards